Due to Louis Riel's ubiquity as one of the most studied figures in Canadian history, the historiography of Louis Riel naturally leads to several interpretations and understandings of actions and reactions depending on the scholar in question. One of the reasons the rebellion or resistance paradigm is so deeply ingrained in the Canadian historical tradition is because Riel has been studied so much. Still this article's challenge is to discover Riel as a human being and to "appreciate the pathos and tragedy" of his life and of Métis history, not to "create, debunk, or venerate" an icon.

Early studies
The first history, entitled A critical history of the Red River Insurrection, after official documents and non-Catholic sources by the Reverend A. G. Morice, was published in 1935, the main purpose of which was the defence of Bishop Taché. Dissatisfaction with Morice's book on the part of the Métis comité historique of the Union Nationale Métisse led to Auguste-Henri Trémaudan being commissioned to write Histoire de la nation métisse dans l'Ouest canadien published in 1936, which provided a more favorable account of the two resistances and which portrayed Riel as 'a nationalist and a leader of a small group of people oppressed by English Canada'.

In 1936 also, George Stanley published The Birth of Western Canada: A History of the Riel Rebellions, which rebellions were not manifestations of the "western battle ground of the traditional hostilities of French Catholic Quebec and English Protestant Ontario" but of the problem of the frontier, of the primitive versus the civilized, of Riel versus the West. In 1945, the French author Marcel Giraud published the massive brilliantly researched Le Métis canadien, son rôle dans l'histoire des prairies de l'Ouest,  which "further cemented the idea that the Métis nation was born of conflict and war". However, these mid-century efforts by Stanley, Giraud and other historians had little impact and it was not until after World War II that Riel was progressively transformed into a national hero. It was especially when historians de-emphasized representing him as a French Catholic Canadian that Riel gained prestige among anglophones.

Published in 1957, W.L. Morton's Manitoba: A History portrays the Red River Colony as "a microcosm of the struggle for Canada" with "a balance between French-Catholic Métis and British-Protestant settlers".  Stanley's Louis Riel published in 1963 is considered to be the benchmark among Riel studies and sets Riel "up to fight a losing battle against the Canadian state."

Regional studies
In the 1960s and 1970s, regional studies increasingly displaced and fragmented the earlier generation of sweeping studies with authors such as Flanagan and Martel arguing, for example, that Riel should be "understood as a messianic prophet struggling against modernity". While revisiting Riel's motivations, these studies left Stanley's more sweeping tenets of conflict between savage and civilized intact such that Riel "remained a figure of resistance".

Contemporary studies
In the 1980s, historians appeared to be less interested in 'great man' aspects of Riel and more interested in Métis history, probing the "Red River myopia", and viewing Riel "as the leader of a much broader social movement across Canada". For example, the 1996 publication of Homeland to Hinterland: The Changing World of the Red River Métis is remarkable for situating Red River Métis between the social and political. Published in 2003, Albert Braz's study The False Traitor was a landmark in investigating dimensions of Riel's life that served to "create an "other" against which Canadian can define themselves". Yet some recent biographies such as Maggie Siggins's liberal-humanistic Riel: A Life of Revolution and J. M. Bumsted's Riel vs. Canada: The Making of a Rebel still paint Riel as Canada's other whereby Riel and the resistance remains fixed in a politico-military framework largely devoid of intellectual and cultural dynamics. For such recent theorists as Adam Gaudry, Darren O'Toole and Chris Andersen, "the resistance is a central element of Métis nationhood".

In 1988, Stanley referred to Riel as a "Canadian legend" and “our Hamlet, the personification of the great themes of our human history.”

Mental health and trial studies
In his 2008 paper Non Compos Mentis: A Meta-Historical Survey of the Historiographic Narratives of Louis Riel's 'Insanity, Gregory Betts's analyzes Riel's high treason trial and related mental health issue in the context of Stanley's four proposed Riel critical perspective categories, "Defender of French language and religious rights, Half-breed patriot, Riel, First western Canadian leader, and Prophet and visionary", these four ideological boundaries  representing "one of the first meta-historical gestures at elevating Riel histories to a self-conscious awareness of how historians participate in determining the meaning of events". Betts concludes that two constants persist in all interpretations of Louis Riel's insanity, his insanity is morally repugnant and had he been conclusively proven insane, the moral integrity of his life and politics would have suffered. Betts cites Siggins and Stanley to the effect that Riel was not insane. Betts ends his paper's conclusion thus: A harrowing silence intermingled with doubt pervades all those touched by the asylum: regardless of the people they might have been or heroes they might become.

Published in 1975, Brown's article The Meaning of Treason in 1885 raises a number of probing questions. Was the charge of treason properly applicable to Riel's crime? Was it legal to lay such a charge against a citizen of the United States? Was the 1352 Statute of Treason's the law in the Northwest Territories at the time of Riel's trial? He concludes that "at law it was a proper charge to lay against Riel", that Riel's U. S. citizenship did not matter since "he was a British subject till his death", and "he was legally chargeable as alien under the doctrine of local allegiance".

In 2021, the RCMP Heritage Centre hosted the 55th anniversary of the production of John Coulter's stage play Trial of Louis Riel, in which production announcement and program archives George Goulet is cited in issues he raises about Riel's mistreatment at the hands of his own seriously deficient counsel, improper trial-related correspondence between John A. Macdonald and Justice Minister Alexander Campbell, John A. Macdonald's handling and rejection of jury's unanimous recommendation for mercy, and "Macdonald's blatant attempts of manipulation, deception, and mendacity" within the medical commission's reports prior to execution.

Riel and historical practice 
According to Hamon:Linked to national crises, particularly the Resistances (previously called Rebellions) of 1869 and 1885, Riel is probably the most written about person in Canadian history. As a result, he has been presented and re-presented for different interests: Catholic martyr to Protestant violence, a French patriot crushed by English fanatics, a spiritual leader, a deranged lunatic, the father of a nation, and an Indigenous hero. This introduction reflects on the significance of Riel for Canadian historical research and writing over the hundred years of existence of the Canadian Historical Review (CHR). It argues that the CHR has been an important vehicle for the professionalization of historical practice in Canada, and Riel has played an important part in that process. This introductory essay provides context and a discussion of the shifting approaches and interpretations of Riel in the CHR, identifying four phases: Civilizing and un-Civilizing Riel; Americanizing and un-Americanizing Riel; Mystifying and De-Mystifying Riel; and Provincializing Canada. It concludes that the history of Louis Riel is entwined with the emergence of professional history in Canada.

Notes

Bibliography

 Book preview link

|

Brown, D.H. (1975). "Meaning of Treason in 1885",  28 (2): 65-80 Saskatchewan History.

Brown, J. (2007). Noms et métaphores dans l’historiographie métisse : anciennes catégories et nouvelles perspectives. Recherches amérindiennes au Québec, 37(2-3), 7–14. 

Dick, L. (1991). The Seven Oaks Incident and the Construction of a Historical Tradition, 1816 to 1970. Journal of the Canadian Historical Association / Revue de la Société historique du Canada, 2(1), 91–113. 

Flanagan, Thomas (1992). Louis Riel, The Canadian Historical Society, Historical Booklet No. 50, ISBN 0-88798-180-1, Notable general bibliography.

 

Giraud, Marcel (1945), Le Métis canadien, son rôle dans l'histoire des prairies de l'Ouest, Paris, Institut d'ethnographie, 1 296 p.. Reprinted in 2 vols., with introduction by J.E. Foster with Louise Zuk, Saint-Boniface, Man.: Éditions du Blé, 1984. Translated by George Woodcock as, The Metis in the Canadian West , Edmonton: University of Alberta Press, 1986 (631pp.; 729 pages
 

.
 
Henderson, Matt (Feb. 29, 2020). "Recasting Riel, Historian claims Métis leader's role, significance has been misinterpreted", Winnipeg Free Press, review of M. Max Hamon's  The Audacity of His Enterprise: Louis Riel  and the Métis Nation That Canada Never Was.

 45 pages

Morton, W. L. (1957, republished 1976). Manitoba: A History. University of Toronto Press..

Mossmann, Manfred  (1985). "The Charismatic Pattern: Canada's Riel Rebellion of 1885 as a Millenarian Protest Movement," Prairie Forum, 10(2): 307–325.
 Published online April 18, 2008

Nieguth, Tim (ed) (2015). The Politics of Popular Culture: Negotiating Power, Identity, and Place, McGill-Queen's University Press, ISBN 978-0-7735-4471-0 
Pannekoek, Frits (Spring 1981). "The Historiography of the Red River Settlement, 1830-1868, Canadian Plains Research Center, Prairie Forum, Vol. VI, No. 1|pp. 75–85.

Rivard, É. (2016). Les Bois-Brûlés et le Canada français : une histoire de famille éclatée. Bulletin d'histoire politique, 24(2), 55–74.  

Teillet, Jean; Wardhaugh, Robert (ed.) 
Trémaudan, Auguste-Henri de (1936).  Histoire de la nation métisse dans l'Ouest canadien, Montréal: Editions A. Lévesque.

 Notable general bibliography.

Louis Riel
Historiography